HMS Diana was variously described as a brig or cutter. Her origins are currently obscure, but the British Royal Navy acquired her at Bombay in 1807. In her short career she captured three armed vessels, one in a notable single-ship action. She was condemned in 1810.

Career
Lieutenant William Kempthorne commissioned Diana in 1807. She sailed from Bombay on her first cruise in May 1807 with only 26 officers and men.

On 8 August 1807 Diane captured Topaze, an American pirate schooner, near Macao. Kempthorne was knocked overboard from his jolly boat, badly wounded in the head and back by boarding pikes. However, he resumed the attack when a cutter came up. Some 29 men aboard Topaze were killed or wounded; Diana had three men wounded. Topaze was later condemned as a prize.

A year later, on 6 August 1808, Diana captured  the Dutch national brig Vlieg, which was anchored near the fort of Serookie in Java. Vlieg was armed with six long 6-pounder guns. She was carrying a number of brass guns for Sourabaya.

Towards the close of 1808, Rear-Admiral Drury wished to threaten Canton in order to press some demands on the Chinese government. He dispatched Kempthorne in command of a small squadron consisting of Diana, a prize brig, and the British East India Company's vessel Discovery. They sailed up the Pearl River to Canton. They blockaded the city until Drury called off the show of force.

Diana and Discovery then sailed to Manila in January 1809 to recover Captain William Pakenham and the  crew of the frigate  which had been wrecked in the Philippines on 4 October 1808.  The Spanish released the crew on parole.

The French chased the two British vessels down to the Straits of Singapore. Diana escaped by throwing her guns overboard and sailing by Point Romania (near Pedra Branca, Singapore), however the French captured Discovery, which was carrying Captain Packenham and some of his officers and crew. The French took their captives to Batavia.

On 10 September 1809 Diana was sailing into the Bay of Amarang (Amurang) in the north-east corner of the island of Celebes when she sighted the Dutch 14-gun brig Zephyr anchored under a fort. During the night Kempthorne sent in his boats only to discover that Zephyr had sailed away. Kempthorne thought that she might have sailed to Manado, some 40 miles away, and set off in pursuit. In the evening of 11 September Diana sighted Zephyr but could not catch up before Zephyr took shelter under the guns of the fort there. As a gale developed, Captain-Lieutenant Gillet Vander-Veld sailed out, with Diana trying to draw him further from out. However, Zephyr then turned back, with Diana following. Diana engaged Zephyr for about 70 minutes, at which time Zephyr struck. She had suffered five men killed and eight wounded out of her crew of 45 men; Diana had no casualties. A few shots from Diana dispersed five gunboats that were rowing out to assist Zephyr. Diana took Zephyr in tow and departed. In 1847 the Admiralty awarded the Naval General Service Medal to the surviving claimants from the action.

Kempthorne named the reefs the "Diana Reefs".

Fate
Diana was surveyed and laid up at Rodrigues in May 1810. This gave rise to an erroneous report in Steel's List that she had been wrecked there. Kempthorne had been recommended for promotion to Commander for his capture of Zephyr, but this report delayed his promotion until April 1811.

Notes

Citations

References

1800s ships
Brigs of the Royal Navy